The house at 64 Main Street in Southbridge, Massachusetts is a vernacular Queen Anne Victorian house built around the turn of the 20th century.  It was built for George Wells, president of the American Optical Company, as a property to rent to factory workers.  Its styling includes a wraparound porch, and diamond-pattern shingles in the gable end, as well as patternwork in the slate roof.  However, it also has some Colonial Revival details, including the window treatments and the front door surround.

The house was listed on the National Register of Historic Places in 1989.

See also
House at 70–72 Main Street, an adjacent worker house also built by Wells
National Register of Historic Places listings in Southbridge, Massachusetts
National Register of Historic Places listings in Worcester County, Massachusetts

References

Houses in Southbridge, Massachusetts
Queen Anne architecture in Massachusetts
Houses completed in 1898
National Register of Historic Places in Southbridge, Massachusetts
Houses on the National Register of Historic Places in Worcester County, Massachusetts